The Communauté d'agglomération de la Porte du Hainaut is an intercommunal structure in the Nord department, in the Hauts-de-France region, northern France. It was created in January 2014. Its seat is in Wallers. Its largest towns are Denain and Saint-Amand-les-Eaux. Its area is 371.4 km2. Its population was 158,754 in 2017.

Composition
The communauté d'agglomération consists of the following 47 communes:

Abscon
Avesnes-le-Sec
Bellaing
Bouchain
Bousignies
Brillon
Bruille-Saint-Amand
Château-l'Abbaye
Denain
Douchy-les-Mines
Émerchicourt
Escaudain
Escautpont
Flines-lès-Mortagne
Hasnon
Haspres
Haulchin
Haveluy
Hélesmes
Hérin
Hordain
Lecelles
Lieu-Saint-Amand
Lourches
Marquette-en-Ostrevant
Mastaing
Maulde
Millonfosse
Mortagne-du-Nord
Neuville-sur-Escaut
Nivelle
Noyelles-sur-Selle
Oisy
Raismes
Rœulx
Rosult
Rumegies
Saint-Amand-les-Eaux
Sars-et-Rosières
La Sentinelle
Thiant
Thun-Saint-Amand
Trith-Saint-Léger
Wallers
Wasnes-au-Bac
Wavrechain-sous-Denain
Wavrechain-sous-Faulx

References

Porte du Hainaut
Porte du Hainaut